Jersey Avenue is a station on the Hudson–Bergen Light Rail (HBLR) located south of Grand Street in Jersey City, New Jersey. The station opened on April 15, 2000. There are two tracks and an island platform.

Northbound service from the station is available to Hoboken Terminal and Tonnelle Avenue in North Bergen. Southbound service is available to terminals at West Side Avenue in Jersey City or 8th Street in Bayonne. Connection to PATH trains to Midtown Manhattan and to New Jersey Transit commuter train service are available at Hoboken Terminal. Transfers to PATH trains to Newark, Harrison, and Downtown Manhattan are available at Exchange Place.

The station is in the developing Liberty Harbor neighborhood near the Jersey City Medical Center.

Station layout

Image gallery

References

External links

 Platform from Google Maps Street View
 Station entrance/pedestrian crossing from Google Maps Street View

Hudson-Bergen Light Rail stations
Transportation in Jersey City, New Jersey
Railway stations in the United States opened in 2000
2000 establishments in New Jersey